Pyrolysis oil may refer to:

 Pyrolysis oil - synthetic liquid fuel (bio-oil) produced by biomass pyrolysis
 Shale oil  - synthetic liquid fuel produced by oil shale processing
 Synthetic fuel - any synthetic fuel produced by pyrolysis
 Coal oil - specific oil shale oil used for illuminating purposes